The conversion of non-Hindu places of worship into temples has occurred in India and elsewhere.

Definition 
The identification of architectural terminology in relation to Indian architecture such as "Hindu", "Buddhist", "Muslim" or "Jain" is problematic. For example, following the current consensus that apsidal shrines are "originally Buddhist," and thus apsidal shrine used in Hindu temples reflect the conversion of an originally Buddhist temple, then Romila Thapar finds that apsidal shrines at Ter, India and Chejerla, India are Buddhist shrines that converted to Hindu structure as result of either gradual conversion or by force. Another example would be the Durga temple in Aihole, India. During the Partition of India, Delhi officials found Hindu idols being installed in mosques to "convert these sites symbolically into Hindu temples." In response, police removed the idols and priests in some cases and even went so far as to destroy existing Hindu temples if found unauthorized or only claimed as Hindu after independence.

Examples 
Since 20th century, many non-Hindu religious sites in the  West were bought and converted into temples to cater for the growing immigrant Hindu community there. It is often homes and other buildings that become converted into temples.

Babri Masjid was demolished in 1992 by a mob of Hindu Kar sevaks. In 2019, the Supreme Court of India awarded the land to Hindu parties and directed the Government of India to establish a trust for the temple construction. A similar size plot was also awarded to muslims to build a mosque.

See also
 Conversion of non-Islamic places of worship into mosques
 Christianized sites
 Hinduism and other religions

References

Religious places
Hinduism and other religions